FC Anzhi-Yunior Zelenodolsk was a Russian football team based in Zelenodolsk. It was founded in 2017 as the second farm-club for FC Anzhi Makhachkala, in addition to FC Anzhi-2 Makhachkala. For 2017–18 season, it received the license for the third-tier Russian Professional Football League. During the winter break of the 2017–18 season, the club dropped out of the professional competition, accumulating large debts to players and suppliers.

References

External links
  Official club VK page

Association football clubs established in 2017
Association football clubs disestablished in 2018
Defunct football clubs in Russia
Sport in Tatarstan
2017 establishments in Russia
2018 disestablishments in Russia
FC Anzhi Makhachkala